William James Cox (1880 – 6 November 1915) was an English professional footballer who played as a centre forward in the Football League for Bury and Leicester Fosse.

Personal life 
Cox was the younger brother of England international forward Jack Cox. After retiring from football, he became a stonemason in Blackpool. Cox served as a private in the King's Own Royal Regiment (Lancaster) at Gallipoli during the First World War. During the campaign, he suffered a leg wound and contracted fatal dysentery. Cox died in hospital in Birmingham on 6 November 1915. He was buried in Layton Cemetery, Blackpool.

Career statistics

References

1880 births
1915 deaths
Footballers from Liverpool
English footballers
English Football League players
Association football forwards
Rossendale United F.C. players
Bury F.C. players
British Army personnel of World War I
King's Own Royal Regiment soldiers
British military personnel killed in World War I
Plymouth Argyle F.C. players
Leicester City F.C. players
Military personnel from Liverpool
Accrington Stanley F.C. (1891) players
Oldham Athletic A.F.C. players
Preston North End F.C. players
Dundee F.C. players
Heart of Midlothian F.C. players
Bradford (Park Avenue) A.F.C. players
Southern Football League players
Western Football League players
Scottish Football League players
Date of birth unknown

English stonemasons